New Discovery may refer to:

New Discovery, Indiana
New Discovery, an album by Artension